Trzebuń  is a village in the administrative district of Gmina Dziemiany, within Kościerzyna County, Pomorskie Voivodeship, in east-central Poland.

References

Villages in Kościerzyna County